The University of California College of the Law, San Francisco, UC Law SF, or UC Law (formerly known as UC Hastings, College of the Law) is a public law school in San Francisco, California. Founded in 1878 by Serranus Clinton Hastings, UC Law SF was the first law school of the University of California as well as one of the first law schools established in California and the Western United States. Although part of the University of California, UC Law SF is not directly governed by the Regents of the University of California. UC Law SF is also one of the few prominent university-affiliated law schools in the United States that does not share a campus with the university's undergraduates or other postgraduate programs.

The law school has an extensive alumni network in California, particularly the San Francisco Bay Area, that includes general counsels, law firm partners, politicians, judges and corporate executives. Notable alumni include Kamala D. Harris, the 49th Vice President of the United States; George R. Roberts, a founding member of the private equity firm Kohlberg Kravis Roberts; Alexander Francis Morrison, the founding member of the international law firm Morrison & Foerster; William H. Orrick, the founding member of the international law firm Orrick, Herrington & Sutcliffe; and Todd Machtmes, the General Counsel of Salesforce.

In November 2021, the Board of Directors of UC Law SF voted to change the name of the institution because of namesake Hastings's involvement in the killing and dispossessing of Yuki people during the California genocide. On July 27, 2022, the Board of Directors voted unanimously to rename the college the University of California College of the Law, San Francisco (UC Law SF). The rename is set to take effect starting in 2023.

History
In 1878, Serranus Clinton Hastings, the first Chief Justice of California, gave $100,000 to be used to create the law school that once bore his name. He arranged for the enactment of a legislative act on March 26, 1878, to create the Hastings College of the Law as a separate legal entity affiliated with the University of California. This was apparently intended for compatibility with Section 8 of the University's Organic Act, which authorized the Board of Regents to affiliate with independent self-sustaining professional colleges.  Another reason for making the gift in this fashion was that Hastings desired to impose certain conditions on his gift, while "policy and law dictated that a free-gift could not be hedged by power of reversion."

According to Hastings College of the Law's official centennial history, its founder, "whether from arrogance, oversight, ignorance, or a combination of all three, was the author of his own troubles." Although the founder had selected the original Hastings College of the Law board of directors from among his professional acquaintances, he failed to adequately verify their concurrence with his beliefs that a proper legal education must include a course in legal ethics and must also be hybridized with elements of a liberal arts education. To his horror, it turned out they all believed that the only purpose of a law school was to provide vocational education in how to practice law. This latter belief was shared by the first professor hired, John Norton Pomeroy, who personally taught the vast majority of courses during Hastings College of the Law's early years. The founder hoped to educate cultured intellectuals who also happened to be lawyers; the board simply wanted to produce lawyers. It was impossible to reconcile these fundamentally different visions, and by September 1882, Serranus Clinton Hastings had become estranged from his own handpicked board. By that point in time, he had come to see the Board of Regents as a superior vehicle for infusing liberal arts and legal ethics into his law school, and in March 1883 arranged for another legislative act that purported to transfer the Hastings College of the Law directly to the University of California and vested responsibility for its governance in the Regents. This was in facial conflict with the "affiliate" language in Section 8 of the Organic Act, so in March 1885, another act was passed to create a pro forma board of trustees for the sole purpose of holding title to Hastings College of the Law assets at arm’s length from the Regents (but under which the Regents would continue to have the right to manage such assets).

In deference to the 1883 act, the Hastings College of the Law board of directors ceased to meet. But because the Regents chose to remain neutral in the long-simmering dispute between board and founder—and did not attempt to exercise any control under the 1883 or 1885 acts—the Hastings College of the Law went through a strange period from September 1882 to April 1885 where it operated with no actual supervision from any governing board.

On April 25, 1885, the Hastings College of the Law board of directors convened to appoint Perrie Kewen as the new registrar, because the previous registrar had died. At the request of Serranus Clinton Hastings, Attorney General Edward C. Marshall challenged Kewen's appointment by initiating a proceeding for a writ of quo warranto in San Francisco County Superior Court. On March 30, 1886, in what became known as Kewen's Case, the Supreme Court of California upheld Kewen's appointment by declaring the 1883 and 1885 acts to be unconstitutional on the basis of a provision of the 1879 state constitution guaranteeing the legislative independence of the University of California. In other words, the 1879 ratification of the state's second constitution (which remains in effect today) effectively stripped the California State Legislature of the power to amend preexisting statutes governing the University of California, including the 1878 act. This was the last time that Serranus Clinton Hastings would try to shape the future of the law school that he had founded; UC Hastings College of the Law has maintained its hard-fought independence from the Regents ever since. The irony of Kewen's Case is that a constitutional provision intended to protect the University of California was applied in such a way as to prevent the University from taking control of its first law school.

In contrast, the "Affiliated Colleges"—the medical, dental, nursing, and pharmacy schools in San Francisco—were affiliated with UC through written agreements, and not statutes invested with constitutional importance by court decisions. In the early 20th century, the Affiliated Colleges agreed to voluntarily submit to the Regents' governance during the term of UC President Benjamin Ide Wheeler, as the Board of Regents had come to recognize the problems inherent in the existence of independent entities that shared the UC brand but over which UC had no real control. While UC Hastings College of the Law remained independent, the Affiliated Colleges began to increasingly coordinate with each other and the rest of the UC bureaucracy under the supervision of the UC President and the Regents, and evolved into the health sciences campus known today as the University of California, San Francisco. In 1900, Hastings College of the Law became one of 27 charter members of the Association of American Law Schools (AALS).

UC Hastings College of the Law was for many years considered the primary law school of the University of California with the purpose of preparing lawyers for the practice of law in the state, whereas the Department of Jurisprudence on the Berkeley campus, which later became Boalt Hall School of Law (now styled Berkeley Law), was intended for the study of law as an academic discipline.

The same statute that affiliated Hastings to UC also designated Hastings College of the Law as UC's "law department." According to UCLA political science professor J.A.C. Grant, it was believed there could only be one "law department" (i.e., only one official UC law school), which is why the Department of Jurisprudence at Berkeley retained its name even after it began to award law degrees. Berkeley did not rename its School of Jurisprudence to a School of Law until the state legislature passed a bill in 1947 authorizing UCLA to create a "school of law." William Lloyd Prosser got wind of this in 1948 while visiting UCLA to help plan the new law school and decided that Berkeley could get away with the same thing.

In the 1960s, UC Hastings College of the Law began the "65 Club", the practice of hiring faculty who had been forced into mandatory retirement at age 65 from Ivy League and other élite institutions. After the passage of age discrimination laws, however, the "65 Club" slowly phased out, and Hastings hired its last "65 Club" professor in 1998. In the mid-1950s, Newsweek published a story where then Harvard Law School dean and jurist Roscoe Pound declared, referring to UC Hastings College of the Law: "Indeed, on the whole, I am inclined to think you have the strongest law faculty in the nation."

Renaming
In 2017, John Briscoe, a UC Hastings College of the Law adjunct professor, published an opinion essay entitled "The Moral Case for Renaming Hastings College of the Law". Briscoe said that the school's founder, Serranus Clinton Hastings, "was promoter and financier of Indian-hunting expeditions in the 1850s" and that his acquisition of land titles "was facilitated by the massacre of the rightful claimants".

The specific charges against Hastings are that he organized militias led by his employees to massacre the Yuki people who lived on or near his extensive land-holdings in Mendocino County, California, in the late 1850s. Hundreds of Yuki, including women and children, were killed in what are called the Round Valley Settler Massacres of 1856–1859.

In 2020, after studying the matter for three years, a commission established by the school confirmed that its founder had managed a forced labor camp, organized murderous "Indian hunts", and otherwise participated actively in the genocide that killed most of the Native American population of Mendocino County, California. However, the commission — which was led by chancellor David L. Faigman — recommended against a proposal to rename the school "as it could lead to public confusion" and "result in a decline in applications and perhaps a loss of philanthropic and alumni support." On October 27, 2021, Faigman clarified his position: "There is no effort from me or the college to oppose a name change...Such a change would require action from the California State Legislature and Governor's office...If changing the name is something the College needs to do to bring restorative action and there is legislative action to facilitate that change, I will engage with that process."

In late October 2021 The New York Times published an article about S.C. Hastings' involvement in genocide against the Yuki and advocating for a name change. The article galvanized alumni, including former San Francisco mayor and Democratic Party power broker Willie Brown, to support a name change. On November 2, 2021, the Board of Directors for the University of California, Hastings College of the Law, voted unanimously to remove Serranus Clinton Hastings from the name of the college. On July 27, 2022, the Board of Directors voted unanimously to rename the college the University of California College of the Law, San Francisco (UC Law SF). The name change bill was signed into law by Governor Newsom on September 23, 2022, and is scheduled to take effect January 1, 2023.

On October 4, 2022, descendants of Serranus Hastings filed suit against the UC Law SF directors and the state to block the name change. The plaintiffs were represented by lawyers Harmeet Dhillon, Gregory Michael and Dorothy Yamamoto. The suit claims that the California act of 1878 contains the terms of a contract with Serranus Hastings. Interviewed in the San Francisco Chronicle, David Carrillo (a member of the law faculty at the University of California, Berkeley, and not involved in the suit) said that there is a distinction between a signed agreement between Serranus Hastings and the state (which could be a binding contract that the legislature cannot repudiate by enactment) and a legislative act (which cannot prevent the Legislature from later amending or repealing it).

Location
UC Law SF campus spreads among four main buildings located near San Francisco's Civic Center: 200 McAllister Street houses academic space and administrative offices, 333 Golden Gate Avenue contains mainly classrooms and faculty offices, 198 McAllister is a 14-story residence complex with 657 units of housing, and 100 McAllister, known casually as "The Tower", contains university office and further student housing, as well as the Art Deco "Sky Room" on the 24th floor.

The campus is within walking distance of the Muni Metro and Bay Area Rapid Transit Civic Center/UN Plaza station. UC Law SF is commonly but affectionately derided by students and alumni as being located in the ugliest corner of the most beautiful city in the world. Indeed, the school has been referred to in jest as "UC Tenderloin."

Located within a two-block radius of the campus is the United States Court of Appeals for the Ninth Circuit, the United States District Court for the Northern District of California, the California Supreme Court, the California Court of Appeal for the First District, San Francisco Superior Court, San Francisco City Hall, United Nations Plaza (and Federal Building Annex), the Asian Art Museum of San Francisco, and the Main Library of the San Francisco Public Library system.

The UCSF Police Department patrols the Hastings campus. The heavy concentration of public buildings within the Civic Center, as well as the high crime rate, result in heavy police presence, and high security, around UC Law SF.

Organization and structure
UC Law SF is managed by a nine-member Board of Directors. The UC Law SF Board of Directors exists independently of, and is not controlled by, the Regents of the University of California. Pursuant to California law, eight of the directors are appointed by the Governor of California. Pursuant to the UC Law SF constitutive documents, the ninth director must be a direct lineal descendant of UC Law SF founder Serranus Clinton Hastings. The Hastings family member now serving on the board is Claes H. Lewenhaupt.

UC Law SF' detachment from the UC Regents gives it a broad degree of independence in shaping educational and fiscal policies; however, due to a shrinking California education budget, UC Law SF must also compete for limited educational funds against its fellow UC campuses. Despite the apparent competition among the UC law schools, UC Law SF was able to maintain its traditionally high standards without having to decrease class size or raise tuition to higher levels than fellow UC law schools, until the California budget crisis in June 2009, first raised the possibility of slashing $10 million in state funding.

A few days later, however, lawmakers rejected the harsh budget cut, agreeing to cut only $1 million and apparently preventing dramatic tuition hikes.

Under California law, if the government ever cuts funding to UC Law SF to below the 19th-century figure of $7,000 a year, the state must return the $100,000, plus interest, to the Hastings family. State Sen. Mark Leno (D-San Francisco) has argued that the rejected $10 million budget cut, in abandoning state financial support for the school, would have allowed the Hastings family to launch an expensive court fight to reclaim the $100,000 plus hefty interest.

Academics

UC Law SF offers a three-year Juris Doctor program with concentrated studies available in seven areas: civil litigation, criminal law, international law, public interest law, taxation, family law, and recently, a new concentration in intellectual property law. Most J.D. students follow a traditional three-year plan. During the first year, students take required courses as well as one elective course. In the second and third years, students may take any course or substitute or supplement their courses with judicial externships or internships, judicial clinics, or study abroad. The college also offers a one-year LL.M. degree in U.S. legal studies for students holding law degrees from foreign law programs. It is an American Bar Association (ABA) approved law school since 1939.

UC Law SF participates in the Concurrent Degree Program with UC Santa Cruz's Masters of Science in Applied Economics and Finance. In this 3+3 program, students may concurrently earn a JD from UC Law SF and a masters degree in applied economics and finance from Santa Cruz, by pursuing the two degrees concurrently, eligible students can earn both degrees in less time than it would take to earn them serially. UC Law SF also participates in the Concurrent Degree Program with U.C. Berkeley's Haas Graduate School of Business. Upon completion of a four-year program, the student earns a Berkeley M.B.A. degree and a J.D. degree from UC Law SF College of the Law.

UC Law SF College of the Law and the UCSF School of Medicine of the University of California, San Francisco have commenced a joint degree program, and in 2011 began enrolling their first class of graduate students in the Master of Studies in Law (MSL) and LL.M. in Law, Science and Health Policy programs. Students have coursework available at each institution for fulfillment of the degrees. This program is a component of the UCSF/UC Law SF Consortium on Law, Science and Health Policy.

UC Law SF has a chapter of the Order of the Coif, a national law school honorary society founded for the purposes of encouraging legal scholarship and advancing the ethical standards of the legal profession. It joined the Association of American Law Schools (AALS) as a charter member in 1900; it renewed its membership in 1949.

Costs
The total cost of attendance (indicating the cost of tuition, fees, and living expenses) at UC Law SF for the 2018–2019 academic year is $49,538 for California residents and $55,538 for non-residents. The Law School Transparency estimated debt-financed cost of attendance for three years is $296,028. UC Law SF does not offer full-tuition scholarships.

Employment outcomes and rankings

Post-graduation employment
According to UC Law SF official 2019 ABA-required disclosures, 70.6% of the Class of 2019 obtained full-time, long-term, JD-required employment nine months after graduation, excluding solo-practitioners. UC Law SF Law School Transparency 2019 under-employment score is 19.7%, indicating the percentage of the Class of 2019 unemployed, pursuing an additional degree, or working in a non-professional, short-term, or part-time job nine months after graduation.

Rank

U.S. News & World Report ranks UC Law SF 50th among top law schools in the US and as the most diverse of the five law schools in the UC system. It was listed with a "B+" in the March 2011 "Diversity Honor Roll" by The National Jurist: The Magazine for Law Students. UC Law SF also has the largest student body and highest student/faculty ratio of the UC law schools.

In January 2011, UC Law SF was given a "B" in the "Best Public Interest Law Schools" listing by The National Jurist: The Magazine for Law Students.In 2021, Super Lawyers magazine ranked UC Law SF 7th in terms of law schools that produced the most "Super Lawyers" in Southern California.

According to Brian Leiter's 2007 law school rankings, UC Law SF ranked 27th in the nation in terms of scholarly impact as measured by academic citations of tenure-stream faculty, on par with USC. In terms of student quality, UC Law SF ranked 33rd in 2008 in the nation by average LSAT score.

According to the Web site "Law School Advocacy," UC Law SF has the No. 1 Moot Court program in the country in 2021, with Top 5 rankings in each of the previous  five years.

A 2013 article in Forbes Magazine ranks UC Law SF 20th among 'The 25 Law Schools Whose Grads Earn The Most'.

Bar passage rates
For the July 2019 California Bar Examination, 80% of UC Law SF Law graduates taking the exam for the first time passed.

Publications

Journals
The oldest law journal at UC Law SF is the Hastings Law Journal, which was founded in 1949. The second oldest journal is the Hastings Constitutional Law Quarterly, which was founded in 1973. Inaugurated in 1997 to oversee the growing number of publications at UC Law SF, the O'Brien Center for Scholarly Publications now manages the publication of the ten UC Law SF journals.
 Hastings Law Journal
 Hastings Constitutional Law Quarterly
 Hastings Communications and Entertainment Law Journal
 Hastings Women's Law Journal
 Hastings International and Comparative Law Review
 Hastings Race and Poverty Law Journal
 West-Northwest Journal of Environmental Law and Policy
 Hastings Science & Technology Law Journal
 Hastings Business Law Journal
Hastings Journal of Crime and Punishment

Books
The O'Brien Center at UC Law SF has published several books:
 Forgive Us Our Press Passes, by Daniel Schorr
 The Traynor Reader: Essays, by the Honorable Roger Traynor.
 Hastings College of the Law – The First Century, a centennial history of the UC Law SF commissioned by the UC Law SF Board in 1973

Notable people

 
Some of the notable graduates of UC Law SF include:

 49th Vice President of the United States Kamala Harris
 California Supreme Court Associate Justice Marvin Baxter
 California Supreme Court Associate Justice Carol Corrigan
 California Supreme Court Associate Justice Wiley Manuel (and first African American Justice to serve on that Court)
 Dan M. Berkovitz the General Counsel of the U.S. Securities and Exchange Commission
Kristin Sverchek the General Counsel of Lyft
Julie Gruber the Chief Legal Officer of Gap Inc.
 U.S. District Judge of the U.S. District Court for the Northern District of California Edward Davila
 Chief U.S. District Judge of the U.S. District Court for the Eastern District of California Lawrence J. O'Neill
 Governor of Nevada Richard Bryan
 Fox News anchor Gregg Jarrett
 U.S. Congressman Chip Pashayan
 U.S. Congresswoman Jackie Speier
 San Francisco Public Defender Jeff Adachi
 The Sharper Image founder Richard Thalheimer
 Willie Brown, the first African American Mayor of San Francisco
 George R. Roberts a founding member of the private equity firm Kohlberg Kravis Roberts
 Alexander Francis Morrison the founding member of the international law firm Morrison & Foerster
 Todd Machtmes the General Counsel of Salesforce
 Richard Zamboldi the General Counsel of Accel
 Santiago “Sam” Fernandez the EVP, & General Counsel of the Los Angeles Dodgers
 John Zecca the Senior Vice President, General Counsel North America, and Chief Regulatory Officer of the Nasdaq
 William H. Orrick the founding member of the international law firm Orrick, Herrington & Sutcliffe
 Andrew Downey Orrick Partner of the international law firm Orrick, Herrington & Sutcliffe, and chairman of the U.S. Securities and Exchange Commission
Mark Vorsatz the Chief Executive Officer of Andersen Tax
 Stephan Eberle the General Counsel of Scale Venture Partners
 J. Christopher Stevens, U.S. Ambassador to Libya

See also

 Christian Legal Society v. Martinez, a 2010 U.S. Supreme Court case, arose from events at UC Law SF in 2003.

References

Further reading
 Barnes, Thomas Garden (1978). Hastings College of the Law: The First Century. San Francisco: University of California Hastings College of the Law Press.

External links

 

 
University of California
Universities and colleges in San Francisco
Civic Center, San Francisco
Law in the San Francisco Bay Area
California, Hastings
Educational institutions established in 1878
1878 establishments in California